The  119 Class of the Great Western Railway consisted of a series of 11  locomotives. They were numbered 119-21 and 123-30 and had originally been built in 1861 at Swindon Works as tender engines to a design of Daniel Gooch, part of the 79 Class. Their rebirth as tank engines was the result of their being renewed at Wolverhampton railway works under the aegis of George Armstrong between 1878 and 1883.

Variations
Three were turned out with condensing gear. All continued as tank locomotives until their withdrawal except for No. 122, which remained a tender engine.

Use
The 119 Class started work in the Northern Division, but most of them migrated south, and most of their subsequent rebuildings were done at Swindon. Eventually most were moved to South Wales.

Rebuilding
From 1913, like nearly all the GWR's saddle tanks, they became pannier tanks as Belpaire boilers were fitted to them. Most were scrapped by 1928, No. 120 soldiering on at Oswestry until 1933.

References

0119
0-6-0ST locomotives
Railway locomotives introduced in 1861
Standard gauge steam locomotives of Great Britain
Scrapped locomotives
Rebuilt locomotives 
Freight locomotives